Dendrochori (old names: , Dymbeni; Bulgarian/Macedonian: Дъмбени, Dambeni or Д’мбени, D'mbeni) is a village in the community Kastraki in the Kastoria regional unit, the region West Macedonia, Greece. Dendrochori is located approximately 10 km northwest of Kastoria and 6 km east of the center of the community Kastraki — the village Ieropigi. Dendrohori has 266 inhabitants (2011).

History
According to narrative history, the village was founded by immigrants from villages Berik, Ano Sliveni (Gorno Sliveni), Saynovo, Vevi (Banitsa) and Agia Paraskevi (Sveta Petka).

In the book “Ethnographie des Vilayets d'Adrianople, de Monastir et de Salonique”, published in Constantinople in 1878, that reflects the statistics of the male population in 1873, Dëmbini was noted as a village with 280 households and 800 Bulgarians as inhabitants. In the same year all of the inhabitants were Greek Orthodox and none of them had turned to the Bulgarian Exarchate. In 1886 the Greek school of Dymbeni was still operating. In 1905, all of its inhabitants turned to Bulgarian Exarchate.

Dendrohori was a Macedonian Bulgarian village of 1650 inhabitants at the beginning of the 20th century. Until 1878 the teaching in the local school was in Greek language. In 1878 Trpo Popovski from neighbour village Kosinec (Ieropigi) started to teach the local pupils the Bulgarian language. There were two Bulgarian schools in the village in the beginning of 20th century.

Subsequently, it was one of the first Slavic villages to revolt against the Ottoman Empire in the Ilinden Uprising of 1903, for which the Turkish army exacted heavy reprisals, killing many of the villagers and burning it to the ground. However a stand at the nearby Battle of Lokvata in which the villagers inflicted disproportionate casualties on a much larger Turkish force became a nationalist rallying point and served as the basis for a poem by Lazar Poptraykov.

The village sided with Bulgaria during the Balkan Wars and the First World War, but became part of Greece following the First Balkan War. From the 1930s and especially 1940s many of its citizens became active in Macedonian separatist and Communist groups, the latter due to the Communists' advocacy on behalf of equal rights for ethnic minorities. The village sided with the National Liberation Front on the Communist side during the Greek Civil War, and was destroyed when the Communists lost the war. Most villagers were forced into exile, and the village was repopulated mainly with Vlach refugees from Epirus.

Notable people 

Christos Gioumbroukis, Greek Macedonian fighter
Lazar Poptraykov, Bulgarian Macedonian komitadji and poet
Christodoulos Papadimitriou, Greek Macedonian fighter

References

External links
Dambeni: Gone But Not Forgotten

Populated places in Kastoria (regional unit)